Simeon Stylites was a Christian ascetic saint who achieved fame for living 37 years on a small platform on top of a pillar near Aleppo in Syria.

Simeon Stylites may also refer to:

 Simeon Stylites the Younger (521–597), Syrian pillar hermit
 Simeon Stylites III (5th century), Syrian pillar hermit
 Simeon Stylites, pen name of Halford E. Luccock (1885–1960) while writing for The Christian Century